Lac de Coiselet is a reservoir on the border between the Ain and Jura departments in France. Its surface area is 3.8 km2. The lake formed in 1970 after the Barrage de Coiselet was built at the confluence of the rivers Ain and Bienne.

External links 

Lakes of Ain
Reservoirs in France
Lakes of Jura (department)